The 96th New York State Legislature, consisting of the New York State Senate and the New York State Assembly, met from January 7 to May 30, 1873, during the first year of John A. Dix's governorship, in Albany.

Background
Under the provisions of the New York Constitution of 1846, 32 Senators and 128 assemblymen were elected in single-seat districts; senators for a two-year term, assemblymen for a one-year term. The senatorial districts were made up of entire counties, except New York County (five districts) and Kings County (two districts). The Assembly districts were made up of entire towns, or city wards, forming a contiguous area, all within the same county.

In his annual message to the 95th Legislature, Gov. John T. Hoffman suggested that a bi-partisan Constitutional Commission of 32 members should be formed. The commission had four members from each judicial district, appointed by the Governor, and confirmed by the State Senate, equally divided between Democrats and Republicans. The Constitutional Commission met on December 4, 1872.

At this time there were two major political parties: the Republican Party and the Democratic Party. A faction of the Republican Party assumed the name of Liberal Republican Party and nominated a fusion ticket with the Democrats, supporting Horace Greeley for president. The Democratic/Liberal Republican state ticket had Francis Kernan (D) for Governor and Chauncey M. Depew (LR) for Lieutenant Governor.

Elections
The 1872 New York state election was held on November 5. Republicans John A. Dix and John C. Robinson were elected Governor and Lieutenant Governor. The other three statewide elective offices up for election were also carried by the Republicans. The approximate party strength at this election, as expressed by the vote for Governor, was: Republicans 446,000 and Democrats/Liberal Republicans 392,000.

Sessions
The Legislature met for the regular session at the Old State Capitol in Albany on January 7, 1873; and adjourned on May 30.

Alonzo B. Cornell (R) was elected Speaker with 91 votes against 35 for John C. Jacobs (D).

William B. Woodin (R) was elected president pro tempore of the State Senate.

On January 21, the Legislature re-elected U.S. Senator Roscoe Conkling (R) to a second six-year term, beginning on March 4, 1873.

The Constitutional Commission adjourned sine die on March 15, 1873. The proposed amendments to the Constitution were then debated by the Legislature, and those approved were submitted to the voters for ratification at the next state elections. At the New York state election, 1873, the voters were asked if the Judges of the Court of Appeals, and the County Judges throughout the State, should be appointed instead of being elected, which was answered in the negative.

State Senate

Districts

 1st District: Queens, Richmond and Suffolk counties
 2nd District: 1st, 2nd, 3rd, 4th, 5th, 7th, 11th, 13th, 15th, 19th and 20th wards of the City of Brooklyn
 3rd District: 6th, 8th, 9th, 10th, 12th, 14th, 16th, 17th and 18th wards of the City of Brooklyn; and all towns in Kings County
 4th District: 1st, 2nd, 3rd, 4th, 5th, 6th, 7th, 13th and 14th wards of New York City
 5th District: 8th, 9th, 15th and 16th wards of New York City
 6th District: 10th, 11th and 17th wards of New York City
 7th District: 18th, 20th and 21st wards of New York City
 8th District: 12th, 19th and 22nd wards of New York City
 9th District: Putnam, Rockland and Westchester counties
 10th District: Orange and Sullivan counties
 11th District: Columbia and Dutchess counties
 12th District: Rensselaer and Washington counties
 13th District: Albany County
 14th District: Greene and Ulster counties
 15th District: Fulton, Hamilton, Montgomery, Saratoga and Schenectady counties
 16th District: Clinton, Essex and Warren counties
 17th District: Franklin and St. Lawrence counties
 18th District: Jefferson and Lewis counties
 19th District: Oneida County
 20th District: Herkimer and Otsego counties
 21st District: Madison and Oswego counties
 22nd District: Onondaga and Cortland counties
 23rd District: Chenango, Delaware and Schoharie counties
 24th District: Broome, Tompkins and Tioga counties
 25th District: Cayuga and Wayne counties
 26th District: Ontario, Seneca and Yates counties
 27th District: Chemung, Schuyler and Steuben counties
 28th District: Monroe County
 29th District: Genesee, Niagara and Orleans counties
 30th District: Allegany, Livingston and Wyoming counties
 31st District: Erie County
 32nd District: Cattaraugus and Chautauqua counties

Note: There are now 62 counties in the State of New York. The counties which are not mentioned in this list had not yet been established, or sufficiently organized, the area being included in one or more of the abovementioned counties.

Members
The asterisk (*) denotes members of the previous Legislature who continued in office as members of this Legislature.

Note: Palmer, Harrower and Allen had been elected as Republicans in 1871, but had joined the Liberal Republicans in 1872, and were barred from the Republican caucus.

Employees
 Clerk: Charles R. Dayton
 Assistant Doorkeeper: James Franklyn Jr.
 Stenographer: H. C. Tanner

State Assembly

Assemblymen
The asterisk (*) denotes members of the previous Legislature who continued as members of this Legislature.

Employees
 Clerk: John O'Donnell
 Assistant Clerk: Samuel P. Allen
 Sergeant-at-Arms: Edward M. Goring
 Doorkeeper: Eugene L. Demers
 Journal Clerk: Edward M. Johnson

Notes

Sources
 Civil List and Constitutional History of the Colony and State of New York compiled by Edgar Albert Werner (1884; see pg. 276 for Senate districts; pg. 290 for senators; pg. 298–304 for Assembly districts; and pg. 373f for assemblymen)
 Life Sketches of Executive Officers and Members of the Legislature of the State of New York by William H. McElroy & Alexander McBride (1873)
 THE ASSEMBLY in NYT on November 7, 1872
 ALBANY; Organization of Both Houses of the Legislature in NYT on January 8, 1873

096
1873 in New York (state)
1873 U.S. legislative sessions